Bergsveinn Bergsveinsson (born 25 January 1968) is an Icelandic former handball player who competed in the 1992 Summer Olympics.

References 

1968 births
Living people
Bergsveinn Bergsveinsson
Bergsveinn Bergsveinsson
Handball players at the 1992 Summer Olympics